Avajiq (formerly, Arab Dizaj (Persian: عرب دیزج), also Romanized as ‘Arab Dīzaj, and ‘Arab-e Dīzaj; also known as Arāb Dizeh, ‘Arab-e Dīzehsī, and ‘Arab Dizehsī) is a city in, and the capital of, Dashtaki District of Chaldoran County, West Azerbaijan province, Iran. At the 2006 census, its population was 1,649 in 377 households. The following census in 2011 counted 1,516 people in 419 households. The latest census in 2016 showed a population of 1,663 people in 486 households. It is the westernmost city in Iran.

Formerly it was the seat of the Iran "Warden of the Marches" for the Turkish border. It is populated by Azerbaijanis.

References 

Chaldoran County

Cities in West Azerbaijan Province

Populated places in West Azerbaijan Province

Populated places in Chaldoran County